Lorenz Bäumer (born in 1965 in Washington, D.C.) is a jeweler and the founder and director of the company of the same name located at 19, Place Vendôme Paris, France. Born to a French mother and a German diplomatic father, Baumer lived his early years in the United States, Jordan, Germany, Austria, Canada and Israel. He moved to Paris at the age of 15 and, in 1988, started to make costume jewelry.  In late 2010, Charlene Wittstock and Albert II of Monaco choose the tiara for their marriage. He married Géraldine Becq de Fouquières, co-founder, with Stanislas Couteaux, brother of far-right politician Paul-Marie Coûteaux, of the online property rental site Book-a-flat.

Recognition 
He was made a Knight in the Order of Arts and Letters in 2004 and then an Officer in 2009. He became a Knight of the Legion of Honor in 2010. He won the Vogue Joyas Special Prize in tribute to his artistic vision and his professional career in 2009). He received the Audacity Award for Talents in Luxury and Creation in 2017.

References

1965 births
Living people
Businesspeople from Paris